The Rasp is a whodunit mystery novel by Philip MacDonald. It was published in 1924 and introduces his series character, detective Colonel Anthony Gethryn.  It is set in a country house in rural England.

Plot summary
Anthony Gethryn, ex-secret service agent, is an occasional "special correspondent" for a weekly newspaper and is assigned to cover the story when a cabinet minister, John Hoode, is found murdered in the library at his country house, battered to death with a wood-rasp.  Gethryn recalls his acquaintance with a member of the household and is thus invited to investigate the crime as a kind of "friend of the family".  It soon seems as though everyone concerned has a cast-iron alibi for the time of the crime, but Gethryn comes up with an imaginative way for the murderer to have accomplished the deed and established an alibi, and reveals the murderer.

Literary significance & criticism
Anthony Gethryn is an early example of the amateur detective, the idea of which was soon to become popular in detective fiction.  The focus on the breaking of an elaborate alibi is similar to the work of Freeman Wills Crofts, MacDonald's contemporary.  "The story is the conventional body-in-the-study, with a fair amount of obvious detection.  ... The killer's fakery is plain from the start.  Despite all this, it has several times been declared "a classic" and "epochmaking" by students of the genre."

Film

The story was made into a film with a screenplay by Philip MacDonald which was directed by Michael Powell in 1932. It starred Claude Horton as Gethryn but is now missing, believed lost. The film is one of Powell's many quota quickies. MacDonald worked again with Powell on Rynox (1932).

Cast
Claude Horton as Anthony Gethryn
Phyllis Loring as Lucia Masterson
C. M. Hallard as Sir Arthur Coates
James Raglan as Alan Deacon
Thomas Weguelin as Insp Boyd

Critical reception
In a contemporary review, Kine Weekly called it "an ingenious murder mystery."

References

1924 British novels
British mystery novels
British novels adapted into films
Novels by Philip MacDonald
Films by Powell and Pressburger
Films directed by Michael Powell
Lost British films
William Collins, Sons books